Dance Dance Revolution II, later released in Europe as Dance Dance Revolution Hottest Party 5, is a music video game in the Dance Dance Revolution series by Konami. It was released on October 11, 2011 for the Nintendo Wii in North America and on November 24, 2011 in Europe. Dance Dance Revolution II is the direct sequel to Dance Dance Revolution for the Wii. This game shares songs with the arcade version of Dance Dance Revolution X3 vs 2ndMix. It features characters from the arcade versions of Dance Dance Revolution.

Gameplay

Double Mode
Double Mode, which was unavailable in previous Wii games, is now available. While playing in Double Mode, the player can only play the full version of licenses and shortened versions for Konami Original. There is no way to play shortened licenses or the full version of Konami Original.

Challenge Difficulty
In addition to the four main difficulties, the game now includes Challenge difficulty, similar to the arcade versions. However, because the special shock arrow (which takes the Challenge difficulty space) are not featured in this game, Challenge charts that originally feature shock arrows in the arcade version are excluded (e.g. smooooch・∀・).

Difficulty Scale Changes
Instead of the traditional ten-foot scale used by previous Wii games, the game now uses the 20-foot difficulty scale first introduced in DDR X. The highest ranked difficulty is the Challenge charts of Valkyrie dimension (in both Single and Double) and the Double-Challenge of POSSESSION, both of which are rated 19 and first introduced in the arcade version of DDR X2.

Full Songs
For the first time in the series since Dance Dance Revolution 5th Mix, players of Dance Dance Revolution II will be able to play long versions of songs. Full versions are only available for licenses and some Konami Original.

Multiplayer
Standard two-player multiplayer will return with the use of dance pads, and the game will support up to four players.

Replicant-D Action
"Replicant-D Action", which previously only available on the arcade version of DDR X2 will be available in this game.  There are now 11 songs inside the folder (the previous seven from DDR X2, two songs from DDR Universe 3, and two new boss songs). Conditions for accessing the folder are now much easier.

Interface and graphics
The song list still kept the same Cover Flow interface first introduced in DDR Hottest Party 3 which features the usual Groove Radar and multi-layered difficulty table. The interface dominantly features light blue color scheme with slant patterns and circles. Parts of the interface were reused in the arcade version of DDR X3 vs 2ndMix.

Characters
Most of the characters are taken from the arcade version of DDR instead of the usual cast from the previous Wii games. The models used are from the arcade version of DDR X2.

Default
Emi
Disco
Yuni
Rage
Ruby
Naoki
Jun
U1

Unlockable
Mii
Rena

Music
There are 83 songs in this game.
Songs with locks indicates it must be unlocked.
Songs with clapperboards indicates it has a dedicated music/background video (displayed in a small screen instead of full screen).

Due to memory limitations, music/background videos are now only displayed in a small screen to the right (for Player 1), left (for Player 2), or middle (Versus or Double Play).

GOLD RUSH only have the original IIDX video displayed. The new "AC DDR" and "CS DDR" versions from DDR X2 AC are not retained.

Full Version
The following list show the available songs that have full version. These songs are differentiated by having pink color scheme on the Groove Radar and difficulty table (instead of blue) and the player would be asked to choose between full or short versions after choosing the song. 

A Year Without Rain
Baby ft. Ludacris
Beautiful Monster
Candy Girl
Can't Be Tamed
Dance Partay
Don't Go
Don't You Want Me
El ritmo te controla
Get Back Up!
Haunted Rhapsody
HEARTBREAK (Sound Selektaz remix)
In My Head
Just A Dream
Just The Way You Are
More Than Alive
New Decade
Nothin' On You (feat. Bruno Mars)
Only Girl (In The World)
Rocket
SAY A PRAYER
Sky Is The Limit
Somebody To Love
Something Special
Spice Up Your Life
still unbreakable
Strip Me
Surrender (PureFocus remix)
Take A Step Forward
Tell Me What to Do
The Heavens Above
This Time I Know It's For Real
UNBELIEVABLE (Sparky remix)
Whip My Hair
Wings of an Angel (Fly With Me)
ZETA ~The World of Prime Numbers and the Transcendental Being~
|}

References

External links
Konami's E3 teaser page for Dance Dance Revolution II
Discussion page for Dance Dance Revolution II at Zenius -I- Vanisher

2011 video games
Dance Dance Revolution games
Video games developed in the United States
Wii games
Wii-only games